The Other Side of Paradise (French: L'envers du paradis) is a 1953 French drama film directed by Edmond T. Gréville and starring Erich von Stroheim, Jacques Sernas and Denise Vernac. Much of the film was shot on location in Provence.

The film's sets were designed by the art director Jean Douarinou.

Cast
 Erich von Stroheim as William O'Hara  
 Jacques Sernas as Blaise d'Orliac  
 Denise Vernac as Claudine de Vervins  
 Jacques Castelot as Gabriel Dautrand  
 Dany Caron as Louisette  
 Dora Doll as Michèle  
 Dina Sassoli as Pepita  
 Edouard Hemme as Le curé  
 Pierre Lorsay as M. Romégoux  
 Edmond Ardisson as Célestin  
 Héléna Manson as Mme Roumégoux  
 Etchika Choureau as Violaine Roumégoux

References

Bibliography
 Lennig, Arthur. Stroheim. University Press of Kentucky, 2004.

External links 
 

1953 films
French drama films
1950s French-language films
French black-and-white films
1953 drama films
Films directed by Edmond T. Gréville
1950s French films